Maribor University Medical Centre is one of the largest medical institutions in Slovenia. It is located in Maribor, in the Magdalena District, on the right bank of Drava river.

Organization
It employs more than 2,800 people, making it largest the employer in Maribor. The hospital has a capacity of 1,266 beds in multiple wards, in which more than 60,000 people are annually. An additional 390,000 people are treated in its clinics every year.

See also
 List of hospitals in Slovenia

References

External links
 Official website

Hospitals in Slovenia
Medical education in Slovenia
Teaching hospitals
Buildings and structures in Maribor
Hospitals established in 2007
Medical and health organizations based in Slovenia
Medical Centre